Olufemi "Femi" Olusegun Pedro (born 29 January 1955) is a Nigerian economist and politician who served as deputy governor of Lagos State from 2003 to 2007. Before his election alongside Bola Tinubu, he was a co-owner and the chief executive officer of First Atlantic Bank, now FinBank.

Pedro is the current chairman of the Small and Medium Enterprise Development Agency of Nigeria (SMEDAN), and the founding chairman of the Lagos State Sports Trust Fund.

Personal life and education

Early childhood
Femi Pedro was born in Lagos Island to Pa Olajide Pedro, an Aguda retired officer of the defunct Western Nigeria Marketing Board, Ikeja, and Modupe Pedro (née Abayomi) on 29 January 1955. Pedro is a descendant of Pa Sanusi Adeyinka Pedro, whose father settled in the Shomolu area of Lagos before moving to Bamgbose Street in Popo Aguda, Lagos Island.

Education
Pedro received a Bachelor of Science in economics from the University of Wisconsin–Superior (1976–1978) and a master's degree in economics from Wichita State University (1979–1981).

Family

He is married to Jumoke Pedro, a High Court judge in Lagos.

Business career
Pedro started his banking career in 1982 when he joined the Central Bank of Nigeria (CBN). He rose to the post of assistant manager in 1985, and became a research economist. In 1986, he was admitted as an associate of the Chartered Institute of Bankers, London, United Kingdom. He worked at First City Merchant Bank (now First City Monument Bank) afterwards in 1988, where he became the executive assistant to the bank's chairman and chief executive officer (CEO). He became the deputy manager and head of corporate planning in the same year.

Pedro became one of the first investors in Guaranty Trust Bank with Fola Adeola, Tayo Aderinokun, Gbolahan Osibodu, Femi Akingbe, and Akin Opeodu. He later took up a senior managerial role at its inception in 1990, and was responsible for opening a multitude of its branches across the southern and northern parts of Nigeria. He served in various capacities at the bank until 1997, when he voluntarily retired. On the eve of his retirement, he was admitted to the fellowship of Chartered Institute of Bankers of Nigeria (CIBN).

In January 1998, Pedro ventured into private business as the chairman of Agro-Corp Ventures Limited, a commodity processing company. The same year (Nov 1998), he was appointed managing director and CEO of Comet Merchant Bank (now FinBank, following the acquisition of the bank by a consortium of investors including himself).

Political career
In his years as the deputy governor, Pedro was appointed chairman of Lagos State Revenue Mobilization committee. They restructured, reorganised and re-engineered the Board of Inland Revenue. His experience in the banking sector helped increase Lagos State's internally generated revenue from a rate of 300 million naira per month to 7 billion naira within eighteen months. He was popularly referred to as "Mr. Pedronomics", primarily due to his affinity towards micro and macro-economic policies.

Pedro introduced and implemented the PSP and waste management model that is currently used in Lagos. He was also in charge of conducting extensive research in Brazil with other cabinet members to study and understand the novel metropolitan bus transport system which resulted in the BRT.

Gubernatorial run
On 13 December 2006, Pedro dumped the Action Congress to declare under the Labour Party. He became the first-ever Nigerian to contest for a gubernatorial election under the Labour Party platform. On 30 January 2007, Pedro named Oluranti Adebule as his running mate for the 19 April elections.

2011 elections
On 24 September 2010 Pedro declared his intention to run for the 2011 governorship election in Lagos State on the platform of Peoples Democratic Party, PDP.

Pedro lost the PDP's party primaries to Ade Dosunmu. He was subsequently appointed as executive vice-chairman of the PDP South West Fund Mobilization Team, which was put together by the presidency to lead the PDP efforts to raise substantial funds for elections in the southwest.

Reconciliation with Tinubu and return to APC
Throughout 2013, indications of reconciliation became evident between Tinubu and Pedro, who had fallen apart in the buildup to the 2007 elections. The Oba of Lagos publicly and privately encouraged the reconciliation after Tinubu attended the wedding ceremony of Pedro's son in 2012, which was the first time they had been publicly seen together since 2006.

In December 2013, Pedro reportedly held a secret meeting with Tinubu, the Rivers State Governor, Rotimi Amaechi, and the interim National Chairman of APC, Chief Bisi Akande, to finalise his move back to APC. Within a matter of days of the report breaking out, Pedro released a statement confirming the allegations.

Post-2015 political appointments
Within days of his return to APC, Pedro was appointed as the chairman of the APC Registration Exercise Committee in February 2014 in Ondo State.

On 12 February 2018, he was appointed as the pioneer chairman of the Lagos State Sports Trust Fund.

On 1 March 2018, Pedro was appointed by President Muhammadu Buhari as the chairman of the board of directors of the Small and Medium Enterprises Development Agency of NIgeria (SMEDAN).

See also 

 Bola Ahmed Tinubu
 Babajide Sanwo-Olu
 Babatunde Raji Fashola
 Akinwunmi Ambode

References

External links
Pedro Names Adebule as Deputy Candidate
Lagos Agog For 200,000-strong Pedro Rally
More Groups throw weight behind Femi Pedro
Pedro Hopes for Free and Fair Elections
Femi Pedro's New Politics
Pedro Unfolds Plan To Combat Crime
Femi Pedro and the Challenges Ahead
Beyond Otunba Femi Pedro's Outing
Pedro Sets Up Political Structure
Pedro Meets With Trade Union Congress
Who Is The Best Man For Lagos?
Femi Pedro and the 2007 Elections
Femi Pedro's Promise to the Electorate
Femi Pedro's Urban Politics
Femi Pedro hopes to make history
Godfatherism in Politics
Femi Pedro's profile at Lagos State
Pedro and The Action Congress
2007 Elections in Lagos

1955 births
Living people
Yoruba businesspeople
Yoruba bankers
Yoruba politicians
Nigerian people of Brazilian descent
Action Congress of Nigeria politicians
Labour Party (Nigeria) politicians
Nigerian bankers
Businesspeople from Lagos
University of Wisconsin–Superior alumni
Wichita State University alumni
20th-century Nigerian businesspeople
21st-century Nigerian businesspeople
Politicians from Lagos
All Progressives Congress politicians
Deputy Governors of Lagos State
Nigerian expatriates in the United States
Nigerian chairpersons of corporations